The Herald of Coming Good. First Appeal to Contemporary Humanity is the first book published by G. I. Gurdjieff.
The book was privately published in Paris in 1933.
The book was published with the help of Charles Stanley Nott a student of Gurdjieff.

Structure 

In addition to the main body of the text, the book contains the following sections:

 A message from The Author
 My First Practical Counsel
 Circular Letter
 A Supplementary Announcement
 A number of Registration Blanks

Contents 

Gurdjieff refers to The Herald of Coming Good Book as "... this first of my writings
intended to head the list of my publications ...". It is a programmatic essay, describing the author's anthropological world view and his ethical concept of a full realization of mankind with reference to the activities of his organization, the Institute For Man's Harmonious Development.

The book contains an outline of all his other writings, All and Everything, consisting of "ten books in three series".

References

External links
 Gurdjieff Bibliographies
 Gurdjieff - A Reading Guide
 Facebook page

1933 books
Books by George Gurdjieff